Mihaly "Michu" Meszaros (Hungarian: Mészáros Mihály; 1 October 1939 – 12 June 2016) was a Hungarian actor, circus performer/entertainer, and stuntman. As an American citizen, he was best remembered as a performer with Ringling Bros. and Barnum & Bailey Circus and for his role in the NBC sitcom ALF. Throughout the 1970s and 1980s, Meszaros was a television and film actor, and he also appeared opposite pop singer Michael Jackson in a Pepsi commercial. His last appearance was in 2015's Death to Cupid.

For the first season of the ALF television series, Meszaros donned a costume whenever a full-body shot was needed for scenes of the alien walking, running, or standing. For the most part, however, upper-body shots of a mechanical puppet were used instead, since the full-body costume was extremely hot and uncomfortable for the actor to wear for long periods of time under bright studio lights. The ALF puppet and costume can be distinguished on first view because the head proportions are slightly different.

Biography 
Meszaros also was a member of the Ringling Brothers and Barnum & Bailey Circus as the former "smallest man in the world". As a youngster, he attended a state-run school of circus arts, becoming well versed in such performing skills as juggling, acrobatics and pantomime. For many years, American circus producers Irvin Feld and Kenneth Feld had heard of the existence, somewhere in Hungary, of a man almost too small to believe. The producers finally located him in 1973; astonished at his size and talents, they made immediate arrangements to bring Meszaros from the Hungarian circus to the United States.

As a circus performer, he trained and presented white standard poodles for his act. Standing on their hind legs, the dogs appeared much taller than their diminutive but commanding trainer. Circus audiences nationwide cheered his dignified though slightly comedic role, in which he was billed as the "Smallest Man in the World". In the so-called Grand Spectacle performance of 1982 and 1983, Meszaros would portray a character known as the Marshal of Marshmallow Gulch, resplendent in a well-tailored white, silver and gold costume encrusted with rhinestones, along with matching cowboy hat and silver boots.

In the 1980s Hawthorne, California, where he resided, named the shortest street in that city "Michu Lane" in his honor.

On 12 June 2016, his manager Dennis Varga announced that Meszaros was in a comatose state in a Los Angeles hospital, after Varga discovered him unconscious on his bathroom floor. He had numerous health issues since a stroke eight years earlier. He died at the Providence Little Company of Mary medical center in Torrance the following night.

His memorial service was held at Dearly Departed Tours & Artifact Museum, where his remains are inurned and on public display along with items from his life and career.

Partial filmography 
 ALF (1986) as ALF (credited as one of Alf's "Assistants")
 Waxwork (1988) as Hans
 Big Top Pee-wee (1988) as Andy
 Look Who's Talking (1989) as "baby stunt performer"
 Dear John (1991) Episode #66 Louise the Hero as Mishka
 Freaked (1993) as George Ramirez #3
 Warlock: The Armageddon (1993) as Augusto
 Death to Cupid (2015) as Leprechaun

References

External links 

Michu Meszaros at Find a Grave

1939 births
2016 deaths
Hungarian male film actors
Hungarian male television actors
Hungarian circus performers
Actors with dwarfism
Entertainers from Budapest
Hungarian emigrants to the United States